Events from the prehistory of Britain (to 1 BC).

Conventions 
 This timeline focuses on species of Homo and covers the Pleistocene from the first evidence of humans.
 The names used for glaciations and interglacials are those with historic usage for Britain and may not reflect the full climate detail of modern studies.
 Dates for the Paleolithic are given as Before Present (BP), which uses 1 January 1950 as the commencement date of the age scale. All later dates are given as Before Christ (BC), which uses the conventional Gregorian calendar with AD 1 as the commencement date of the age scale.

Events

Paleolithic 

 970,000 to 936,000 BP
 Paleolithic flint tools at Happisburgh, Norfolk. The earliest known evidence of Homo sp. in Britain, presumed to be Homo antecessor.
 700,000 BP
 Flints tools at Pakefield. Possibly a cross between Homo antecessor and Homo heidelbergensis.
 500,000 BP
 Remains of Homo heidelbergensis at Eartham Pit, Boxgrove, Sussex. The earliest human remains found in Britain.
 478,000 BP
 Anglian glaciation begins – the most extreme in the Pleistocene. Britain almost completely under ice.
 450,000 BP
 The Weald-Artois Anticline breaks for the first time after a glacial lake outburst flood. This landbridge to the continent was cut for the first time creating the English Channel. It would now reflood after every glaciation ended.
 425,000 BP
 Hoxnian Interglacial begins as the Anglian glaciation ends.
 400,000 BP
 Bones of a young female Neanderthal (Homo neanderthalensis) at Swanscombe Heritage Park, Kent. Earliest evidence of Neanderthals in Britain.
 352,000 BP
 Wolstonian glaciation begins. Neanderthal occupation intermittent.
 180,000 BP
 Neanderthals completely driven out. There will be no human occupation of any kind for many thousands of years.
 160,000 BP
 A second megaflood widens the break in the Weald-Artois Anticline.
 130,000 BP
 Ipswichian Interglacial begins.
 125,000 BP
 Rising sea levels cut Britain off completely from the continent. It is warm enough for hippos in the Thames and lions on the site of Trafalgar Square, but Neanderthals did not cross the landbridge in time so there are no Homo sp. present.
 115,000 BP
 Devensian glaciation ('Last Glacial Period') begins.
 60,000 BP
 Sea levels have dropped sufficiently for Neanderthals to return to Britain in the warmer periods, possibly only as summer visitors.
 44,000-41,000 BP
 Jawbone from Kents Cavern. First evidence of modern humans (Homo sapiens) in Britain.
 40,000 BP
 Neanderthals go extinct across Europe.
 26,000-13,000 BP
 Dimlington stadial ('Last Glacial Maximum'). Britain almost entirely under ice. Southern England a polar desert. Humans driven out.
 16,500-14,670 BP
 Windermere interstadial (the 'Allerød oscillation' or 'Late Glacial Interstadial'). Temperatures rise. Homo sapiens returns to Britain.
 12,890-11,700 BP
 Loch Lomond stadial ('Younger Dryas'). Temperatures drop rapidly. Humans driven out.
 11,700 BP
 The Holocene warming begins as the end of the Younger Dryas stadial ends the Pleistocene. The first Mesolithic people arrived and this marks the start of continuous human (Homo sapiens only) occupation.

Mesolithic 

 c. 9335–9275 BC
 The earliest date for structures and artefacts at Star Carr, Yorkshire, a site then inhabited for around 800 years.
 c. 7600 BC
 Howick house, Northumberland, a Mesolithic building with stone tools, nut shells and bone fragments.
 c. 7150 BC
 Cheddar Man, the oldest complete human skeleton in Britain
 c. 6500-6200 BC
 Rising sea-levels cause the flooding of Doggerland. The culminating tsunami caused by the Storegga Slide, cuts Great Britain off from the continent.
 c. 6000 BC
 The earliest evidence of some form of agriculture: Wheat of a variety grown in the Middle East was present on the Isle of Wight.
 c. 4600-3065 BC
 Date range of artefacts from a Mesolithic midden on Oronsay, Inner Hebrides, giving evidence of diet.

Neolithic 

 c. 4000 BC
 Neolithic period begins in Britain, introducing the first agriculture.
 c. 3500 BC
 Garth tsunami impacts the Northern Isles.
 c. 3000 BC
 First henge monuments.
 c. 2600 BC
 Main phase of construction at Stonehenge begins, replacing earlier wooden and earthen works.
 c. 2300 BC
 Arrival of the Beaker People in Britain, replacing 90% of the earlier population.

Bronze Age 

 c. 1800 BC
 Wessex culture brings bronze-working to Britain.
 c. 1600 BC
 Last construction at Stonehenge.
 c. 1400 BC
 Wessex culture replaced by more agrarian peoples; stone circles and early hillforts produced.
 c. 1380-550 BC
 Uffington White Horse hill figure cut in Oxfordshire.

Iron Age 

 c. 800 BC
 Celts bring iron working to Britain; Hallstatt Culture.
 c. 400 BC
 Parisi tribe from northern France settle in Yorkshire.
 First brochs constructed.
 c. 330 BC
 Pytheas of Massilia circumnavigates Britain.
 c. 300 BC
 La Tène artwork introduced from northern France.
 c. 100 BC
 First wave of Belgic invaders settle in the south-east, establishing the Catuvellauni and Trinovantes tribes.
 First coins introduced.
 c. 80 BC
 Second wave of Belgic invaders settle in Sussex, Berkshire, and Hampshire, establishing the Atrebates and Regni tribes.
 55 BC
 Commius, chieftain of the Atrebates, captured by the British after serving as an envoy to Rome.
 26 August – Julius Caesar lands between Deal and Walmer, wins skirmishes against the British, and frees Commius.
 31 August – Britons in war-chariots defeat the Romans. Romans return to Gaul.
 54 BC
 July – Julius Caesar invades Britain and defeats the Catuvellauni under Cassivellaunus.
 September – Tribute fixed, and peace agreed between the Catevellauni and the Trinovantes, allied with Rome. Romans return to Gaul.
 50 BC
 Fleeing to Britain after a failed revolt in Gaul, Commius becomes chieftain of the Atrebates.
 34 BC
 Emperor Octavian makes an alliance with the Atrebates and Trinovantes.
 c. 25 BC
 Tincommius, leader of the Atrebates, issues Roman-style coinage.

See also 
 Timeline of prehistoric Scotland
 Prehistoric Britain
 List of extinct animals of the British Isles
 List of extinct plants of the British Isles

References 

British history timelines
Prehistoric Britain